Major General Ronald Alwyn Grey,  (2 July 1930 – 20 January 2022) was a senior Australian Army officer who served as Commissioner of the Australian Federal Police (1983–88).

Military career
Grey served in the Australian Army from 1950 to 1983, attaining the rank of major general in 1978. During his career he served in Borneo, Korea, and Vietnam.

Grey was Mentioned in Despatches in recognition of gallant and distinguished conduct in the Borneo Territories during the period 24 December 1965 to 23 June 1966.

He was awarded the Distinguished Service Order in 1971 for his role as the Commanding Officer of 7th Battalion, Royal Australian Regiment in Vietnam, and was also awarded the Vietnam Cross of Gallantry with Palm.

He served as Chief of Operations – Army, and as General Officer Commanding Field Force Command in the early 1980s. For his service in these positions, Grey was appointed an Officer of the Order of Australia.

Commissioner, Australian Federal Police
Grey was the Commissioner of the Australian Federal Police from 1983 to 1988.

Later career and death
In 1988, Grey was commissioned to undertake a review of the rescue services in New South Wales. The recommendations of his review were implemented by the New South Wales government in 1989.

Grey died on 20 January 2022, at the age of 91.

References

External links
Portrait by Heide Smith

|-

1930 births
2022 deaths
Military personnel from Western Australia
Australian Companions of the Distinguished Service Order
Australian generals
Australian military personnel of the Indonesia–Malaysia confrontation
Australian military personnel of the Korean War
Australian military personnel of the Vietnam War
Commissioners of the Australian Federal Police
Officers of the Order of Australia
People educated at Perth Modern School
People from Perth, Western Australia